"Every Little Thing U Do" is a song by American R&B artist Christopher Williams recorded for his second album Changes (1992). The song was released as the album's third single in March 1993.

Track listings
12", Vinyl
"Every Little Thing U Do" (Album Version) - 4:43
"Every Little Thing U Do" (Radio Mix) - 4:15
"Every Little Thing U Do" (DawgHouse Mix) - 4:38
"Every Little Thing U Do" (Supermen Mix) - 5:15
"Every Little Thing U Do" (Mr. Kent's Mix) - 5:10
"Every Little Thing U Do" (Clark and Tim Flip Da Bass) - 5:15
"Every Little Thing U Do" (Instrumental) - 4:43

CD
"Every Little Thing U Do" (Album Version) - 4:46
"Every Little Thing U Do" (DawgHouse Mix) - 4:39
"Every Little Thing U Do" (Radio Mix) - 4:18
"Every Little Thing U Do" (Supermen Mix) - 5:18
"Every Little Thing U Do" (Clark and Tim Flip Da Bass) - 5:17
"Every Little Thing U Do" (Mr. Kent's Mix) - 5:11
"Every Little Thing U Do" (Instrumental) - 4:45

Personnel
Information taken from Discogs.
executive production – Andre Harrell, Christopher Williams
production – 3 Boyz from Newark
rapping – Buttnaked Tim Dawg
remixing – Buttnaked Tim Dawg, DJ Clark Kent
vocal arranging – Christopher Williams

Charts

Notes

External links

1993 singles
Christopher Williams (singer) songs
1992 songs
Uptown Records singles
Songs written by Vincent Herbert
Songs written by Christopher Williams (singer)